Chief Mrs Leila Euphemia Apinke Fowler, MFR (born March 23, 1933) is a Nigerian educationalist who founded a school. She is the Yeye Mofin.

Life
Fowler was born in Lagos in 1933. Her father was Peter Henry Moore. She attended the CMS Girls School, Lagos, but qualified with a Cambridge Certificate at the Queen of Rosary College, Onitsha in 1951. She initially worked as a teacher and started to train as a nurse in London. She quit and she met her future husband who was a consultant in Lagos. They married in 1953 and they had three children.

Fowler trained to be a lawyer at the Middle Temple and studied at the University of London. She was called to the UK Bar in 1962 and the Supreme Court of Nigeria in 1963. She worked for two groups of Lagos lawyers before launching her own company where she specialised in insurance law.

Fowler founded the Vivian Fowler Memorial College for Girls in January 1991. The school was named after her daughter who had died.

Her husband, Professor Vidal Fowler, died in 2015.

Her grand daughter Funke Fowler started a boutique in Lagos which is called Leila Fowler after her grand mother. The boutique is aimed at high class shoppers.

References

1933 births
Living people
Educators from Lagos
Founders of Nigerian schools and colleges
St Anne's School, Ibadan alumni
Nigerian women lawyers
Alumni of the University of London
20th-century Nigerian lawyers
Nigerian women educators
Lawyers from Lagos
20th-century women lawyers